May 22 - Eastern Orthodox Church calendar - May 24

All fixed commemorations below celebrated on June 5 by Orthodox Churches on the Old Calendar.

For May 23rd, Orthodox Churches on the Old Calendar commemorate the Saints listed on May 10.

Saints
 Holy Myrrh-bearer Mary, the wife of Cleopas, aunt of Jesus (1st century)
 Saint Manaen (Manahen), prophet and teacher of the Church of Antioch (Acts 13:1) (1st century)
 Martyr Seleucus (Selefkos), by sawing.
 Saint Michael the Confessor, Bishop of Synnada in Phrygia Salutaris (826)
 Hieromartyr Michael the black-robed, monk of St. Sabbas Monastery (9th century)

Pre-Schism Western saints
 Hieromartyrs Epitacius, first Bishop of Tui in Galicia (Spain); and Basileus, second Bishop of Braga in Portugal c. 60-95 (1st century)
 Saint Euphebius, Bishop of Naples in Italy.
 Martyr Salonas the Roman, by the sword.
 Martyrs Donatianus and Rogatianus of Nantes, brothers (c. 284-305)
 Saint Merculialis of Forli (Mercurialis), Bishop of Forlì, zealous opponent of paganism and Arianism (406)
 Saint Desiderius of Langres, Bishop of Langres in Gaul (407)
 Martyrs Quintianus, Lucius and Julianus, with 19 other Christians in North Africa during the persecution of the Arian Vandals (430)
 Saint Patricius (Patrice), Bishop of Bayeux in Normandy 464-469 AD (469)
 Saints Eutychius and Florentius, two monks who governed a monastery in Valcastoria near Nursia, Italy (540)
 Saint Goban (Gobhnena), Abbot of the monastery of Old Leighlin, from where he went to Tascaffin in Co. Limerick, Ireland (6th/7th century)
 Hieromartyr Desiderius, Bishop of Vienne (608)
 Saint Syagrius (Siacre) of Nice, a monk at Lérins Abbey, who later founded the monastery of St Pons, at Cimiez, after which he became Bishop of Nice 777-787 (787)
 Saint Guibertus, a hermit on his own estate of Gembloux in Brabant, Belgium, who retired to the monastery of Gorze in France (962)

Post-Schism Orthodox saints
 Saint Damian (Damianos in monasticm), (King Demetrius) of Georgia (1125-1156), Hymnographer (1156)
 Saint Euphrosyne of Polatsk, Princess (1173)
 Saint Simon, Bishop of Suzdal (c. 12th century)
 Saint Abramios of Yaroslavl, monk and abbot of the Savior Monastery in Yaroslavl (1219)
 Saint Ioannicius I, Metropolitan of Peć and Archbishop of Serbia 1272-1276 AD (1279)
 Saint Anthony, Bishop of Rostov (1336)
 Saint Cyril, Bishop of Rostov (1384)
 Saint Paisius of Galich, abbot (1460)
 Saints Adrian and Bogolep of Uglich, monks of St. Paisius of Uglich Monastery (late 15th century)
 Saints Anthony and Joannicius of Zaonikiev Monastery (Vologda) (16th century)
 Saint Dorotheus of Pskov Lavra, monk and hermit (1622), and Monk Hilarion of the Dormition of the Theotokos monastery near Podolsk (17th-18th century)
 Saint Alexander, Bishop and Wonderworker of Pereiaslav (17th century)
 Saint Joachim, monk of St. Nicholas monastery of Sartoma (17th century)
 Synaxis of All Saints of Rostov and Yaroslavl (established on March 10, 1964):
 Rostov Wonderworkers: Bishop Leontius (1073); Archimandrite Abraham the wonderworker (1073-1077); Bishop Isaiah, wonderworker (1090); Prince Basil (1238); Bishop Ignatius (1288); Peter, Tsarevich of Ordynsk (1290); Bishop James (1391); Archbishop Theodore (1394); Blessed Isidore, Fool-for-Christ (1474); Blessed John of the Hair-Shirt (the Merciful), Fool-for-Christ (1580); Monk Irenarchus the Hermit (1616); Metropolitan Demetrius (1709); 
 Yaroslav Wonderworkers: Princes Basil (1249); Constantine (1257); Theodore (1299) and his sons David (1321) and Constantine (XIV); 
 Pereslavl Wonderworkers: Monk Nikita the Stylite (1186); Prince Alexander Nevsky (1263); Prince Andrew of Smolensk (15th century); Monk Daniel the Archimandrite (1540); 
 Uglich Wonderworkers: Prince Roman (1285); Monk Paisius (1504); Monk Cassian (1504); Monk Ignatius of Lomsk (1591); Tsarevich Demetrius (1591); 
 Poshekhonsk Wonderworkers: Monk Sylvester of Obnora (1379); Monk Sebastian (1542); Hieromartyr Adrian (1550); Monk Gennadius of Liubimograd and Kostroma (1565).

Other commemorations
 Icon of the Theotokos  'Thou Art the True Vine' .
 Uncovering of the relics (1164) of St. Leontius, Bishop and Wonderworker of Rostov (1073)
 Saint Athanasius of Novolotsk, fool-for-Christ (16th/17th century)
 Hieromartyr Daniel with 30 monks and 200 laymen of Uglich, during the Polish–Muscovite War (1608)
 Repose of Hieromonk Damascene of Valaam (1825)
 Repose of Hieroschemamonk Meletius of Svir, disciple of Elder Theodore of Svir (1877)
 Repose of Nun Euphrosyne, disciple of St. Barsanuphius of Optina (1934)
 Restitution of the holy relics of Saint Joachim of Ithaca (1868)
 Uncovering of the relics of martyrs Evdokia Sheykovoy, Daria Timaginoy, Daria Ulybin, and Mary Neizvestnaya (2001)

Icon gallery

Notes

References

Sources 
 May 23/June 5. Orthodox Calendar (PRAVOSLAVIE.RU).
 June 5/May 23. HOLY TRINITY RUSSIAN ORTHODOX CHURCH (A parish of the Patriarchate of Moscow).
 Complete List of Saints. Protection of the Mother of God Church (POMOG).
 May 23. OCA - Lives of the Saints.
 Dr. Alexander Roman. May. Calendar of Ukrainian Orthodox Saints (Ukrainian Orthodoxy - Українське Православ'я).
 Dr. Alexander Roman. Saints of the Kyivan Baroque Period. Ukrainian Orthodoxy - Українське Православ'я.
 May 23. Latin Saints of the Orthodox Patriarchate of Rome.
 May 23. The Roman Martyrology. 
Greek Sources
 Great Synaxaristes:  23 ΜΑΪΟΥ. ΜΕΓΑΣ ΣΥΝΑΞΑΡΙΣΤΗΣ.
  Συναξαριστής. 23 Μαΐου. ECCLESIA.GR. (H ΕΚΚΛΗΣΙΑ ΤΗΣ ΕΛΛΑΔΟΣ). 
Russian Sources
  5 июня (23 мая). Православная Энциклопедия под редакцией Патриарха Московского и всея Руси Кирилла (электронная версия). (Orthodox Encyclopedia - Pravenc.ru).
  23 мая (ст.ст.) 5 июня 2013 (нов. ст.). Русская Православная Церковь Отдел внешних церковных связей. (DECR).

May in the Eastern Orthodox calendar